Habib Ammar (born 15 November 1946) is a Tunisian handball player. He competed in the men's tournament at the 1976 Summer Olympics.

References

External links

1946 births
Living people
Tunisian male handball players
Olympic handball players of Tunisia
Handball players at the 1976 Summer Olympics
Place of birth missing (living people)